Paul Hinder, O.F.M. Cap. (born 22 April 1942) is a Swiss Catholic bishop. He is the Vicar Apostolic Emeritus of the Apostolic Vicariate of Southern Arabia. Bishop Hinder was previously appointed as an Auxiliary Bishop in the former Apostolic Vicariate of Arabia on 30 January 2004.

Early life 

Paul Hinder was born in Bussnang, Switzerland, on 22 April 1942 to Wilhelm Hinder and Agnes Meile. He joined the Franciscan Capuchin Order in 1962 and was ordained a priest on 4 July 1967. After specialized studies in canon law in Munich and Fribourg, he obtained his doctorate in theology in 1976. He was active as a professor, in the formation of young Capuchins, later as provincial in Switzerland and as General Councilor in Rome for the worldwide Capuchin Order.

Bishop 

On 20 December 2003, Hinder was appointed Auxiliary Bishop of Arabia and was ordained Bishop on 30 January 2004 in Abu Dhabi. On 21 March 2005, he succeeded Msgr. Bernardo Gremoli as Vicar Apostolic of Arabia (UAE, Oman, Yemen, Qatar, Bahrain, Saudi Arabia). After the Vicariate of Arabia was divided into the Northern and Southern Vicariates in 2011, Bishop Paul was appointed to the Apostolic Vicariate of Southern Arabia (UAE, Oman, Yemen).

Hinder is a member of the Pontifical Council for the Pastoral Care of Migrants and Itinerant Peoples, a consultor to the Congregation for the Evangelization of Peoples, and the Pontifical Council for Interreligious Dialogue. He is also a member of the Conference of the Latin Bishops of the Arab Regions.

On 13 May 2020, he was named as The Apostolic Administrator "sede vacante et ad nutum Sanctae Sedis" of Northern Arabia  (Kuwait, Bahrain, Qatar, and Saudi Arabia). The appointment was announced through a decree and signed by Cardinal Tagle, The Prefect of the Congregation for the Evangelization of Peoples. On 23 January 2023, Pope Francis appointed Msgr. Aldo Berardi, O.SS.T. as the Apostolic Vicar of Northern Arabia succeeding Msgr. Camillo Ballin, MCCJ, who passed away on April 12, 2020.

On 1 May 2022, Pope Francis accepted the resignation of Msgr. Hinder and appointed Msgr. Paulo Martinelli OFM Cap. to take his place as the Vicar Apostolic of Southern Arabia.

References

External links

 About Msgr. Hinder, Vicariate Website
 Interview with Msgr. HInder

|-

|-

Living people
1942 births
Capuchin bishops
21st-century Italian titular bishops
Swiss Roman Catholic bishops
Roman Catholic bishops in the Middle East
Apostolic Vicariate of Southern Arabia
Catholic missionaries in Arabia
Apostolic Vicariate of Northern Arabia
Apostolic Vicariate of Arabia
Catholic Church in the Arabian Peninsula